Adolfo Contoli (19 February 1898 – 19 May 1988) was an Italian versatile athlete. He participated at the 1924 Summer Olympics. He was born in Bologna.

Achievements

National titles
Adolfo Contoli has won 24 times the individual national championship.
5 wins on 100 metres hurdles (1921, 1922, 1923, 1924, 1926)
2 wins on 400 metres hurdles (1920, 1921)
1 win on Pole vault (1923)
2 wins on Long jump (1920, 1922)
3 wins on Standing high jump (1920, 1921, 1922)
3 wins on Standing long jump (1920, 1921, 1922)
3 wins on Standing triple jump (1920, 1921, 1922)
4 wins on Pentathlon (1921, 1922, 1923, 1924)
1 win on Decathlon (1922)

See also
 Men's long jump Italian record progression
 Italian Athletics Championships - Multi winners

References

External links
 

1898 births
1988 deaths
Italian male hurdlers
Italian decathletes
Athletes (track and field) at the 1924 Summer Olympics
Olympic athletes of Italy
Olympic decathletes
Italian Athletics Championships winners